Abu al-Qasim Maslama ibn Ahmad al-Majriti (: c. 950–1007), known or Latin as , was an Arab Muslim astronomer, chemist, mathematician, economist and Scholar in Islamic Spain, active during the reign of Al-Hakam II. His full name is Abu ’l-Qāsim Maslama ibn Aḥmad al-Faraḍī al-Ḥāsib al-Maj̲rīṭī al-Qurṭubī al-Andalusī.

Achievements
Al-Majrīṭī took part in the translation of Ptolemy's Planisphaerium, improved existing translations of the Almagest, introduced and improved the astronomical tables of Muhammad ibn Musa al-Khwarizmi, aided historians by working out tables to convert Persian dates to Hijri years, and introduced the techniques of surveying and triangulation.

According to Said al-Andalusi, he was the best mathematician and astronomer of his time in al-Andalus. He also introduced new surveying methods by working closely with his colleague ibn al-Saffar. He also wrote a book on taxation and the economy of al-Andalus.

He edited and made changes to the parts of the Encyclopedia of the Brethren of Purity when it arrived in al-Andalus.

Al-Majrīṭī also predicted a futuristic process of scientific interchange and the advent of networks for scientific communication. He built a school of Astronomy and Mathematics and marked the beginning of organized scientific research in al-Andalus. Among his students were Ibn al-Saffar, Abu al-Salt and at-Turtushi.

Pseudo-Majrīṭī
From his date of death, inconsistencies result in the dating of two influential works in alchemy attributed to him, as either they were published long after his death, or they were the work of someone else claiming some of his glory: the latter is the current general belief.

The two works are the "Sage's Step/The Rank of the Wise" (Rutbat al-hakim, ?1009) and the Picatrix. Both were translated into Latin, in a version somewhat bowdlerised by Christian dogma, in 1252 on the orders of King Alfonso X of Castile; the original Arabic text dates probably from the middle of the eleventh century.

The Rutbat includes alchemical formulae and instructions for purification of precious metals, and was also the first to note the principle of conservation of mass, which he did in the course of his pathbreaking experiment on mercury(II) oxide:

The Picatrix is more concerned with advanced esotericism, principally astrology and talismanic magic, although he also goes into prophecy. The author considers this the advanced level of work, occasionally referring to the Rutbat as the foundation text.

Supposed daughter

Several modern sources state that al-Majriti had a daughter, Fátima de Madrid, who was also an astronomer. However, the earliest known mention of her is a short biographical article on her in the Enciclopedia universal ilustrada europeo-americana, published in the 1920s.

See also
Al-Andalus
Alchemy

References

External links
 
  (PDF version)

950s births
1007 deaths
10th-century Arabs
11th-century Arabs
Astronomers from al-Andalus
Mathematicians from al-Andalus
10th-century Muslim scholars of Islam
People from Madrid
Alchemists of the medieval Islamic world
10th-century writers from al-Andalus
Scholars from al-Andalus
Mathematicians who worked on Islamic inheritance
Year of birth unknown
Astrologers from Al-Andalus